Belimbing is a small town in Pekan District, Pahang, Malaysia, located near Pahang River and Lake Chini. Belimbing means star fruit in Malay.

References

Pekan District
Towns in Pahang